Henry F. Jim Miller (February 19, 1908 – February 10, 1965) was an American football halfback who played two seasons with the Brooklyn Dodgers of the National Football League. He played college football at West Virginia Wesleyan College and attended Sharpsburg High School in Sharpsburg, Pennsylvania.

References

External links
Just Sports Stats

1908 births
1965 deaths
Players of American football from Pennsylvania
American football halfbacks
West Virginia Wesleyan Bobcats football players
Brooklyn Dodgers (NFL) players
People from Sharpsburg, Pennsylvania